Joshua Moufawad-Paul is a Canadian academic and writer from Toronto, Canada. He is a professor of philosophy at York University. A Maoist philosopher, Moufawad-Paul has written several works on the topic and regularly posts on his blog M-L-M Mayhem which focuses on his conception of the philosophy of Maoism.

In 2020, Moufawad-Paul received media attention when he started a petition in response to publisher Rowman & Littlefield's planned "Problems in Anti-Colonialism" series. The petition urged the publisher to withdraw Bruce Gilley's book The Last Imperialist: Sir Alan Burns’ Epic Defense of the British Empire, claiming the book endorsed a "white nationalist perspective" and that the publisher was giving academic credibility to "settler-colonial propaganda". Gilley had earlier written a controversial essay entitled The Case for Colonialism. While some critics accused Moufawad-Paul of censorship and "cancel culture", the publisher ultimately scrapped the series, and Gilley's own book was published by Regnery Gateway instead.

Publications 
 The Communist Necessity (Montreal: Kersplebedeb, 2014)
 Continuity and Rupture (Winchester: Zero Books, 2016)
 Austerity Apparatus (Montreal: Kersplebedeb, 2017)
 Methods Devour Themselves (with Benjanun Sriduangkaew) (Winchester: Zero Books, 2018)
 Demarcation and Demystification (Winchester: Zero Books, 2019)
 Critique of Maoist Reason (Paris: Foreign Languages Press, 2020)
 Politics In Command: A Taxonomy of Economism (Paris: Foreign Languages Press, 2022)

References

External links 
 

Canadian political philosophers
21st-century Canadian philosophers
Living people
Canadian Marxist writers
Marxist theorists
Maoist theorists
Year of birth missing (living people)
York University alumni